NGC 4513 is a lenticular galaxy and a ring galaxy located about 110 million light-years away in the constellation Draco. It was discovered by astronomer Heinrich d'Arrest on October 16, 1866.

Physical characteristics 
NGC 4513 has a large and very faint ring that is quite separated from the main galactic disk. The disk is gaseous and counter-rotates with respect to the inner disc. The outer part of the inner disc exhibits a population of counter-rotating stars that may be related to the outer ring. The observed counter-rotation suggests that the ring resulted from the accretion of gas from the passage of another galaxy. However, Ilyina et al. proposed that the ring is the result of a satellite galaxy vertically impacting onto the central part of NGC 4513 as the ring is bright in UV and is symmetric.

Group Membership
NGC 4513 is a member of the NGC 4256 Group which lies in the upper plane of the Virgo Supercluster.

See also 
 List of NGC objects (4001–5000)
 Hoags Object
 NGC 6028

References

External links

4513
41527
Draco (constellation)
Astronomical objects discovered in 1866
Lenticular galaxies
Ring galaxies
7683
Virgo Supercluster
Discoveries by Heinrich Louis d'Arrest